The Rally for the Development of Burkina (RDB) was a political party in Burkina Faso led by Celestin Saidou Compaoré.

History
In April 2005 it joined the Convention of Democratic Forces together with the Convention for Democracy and Federation and the Greens of Burkina. In the 2007 parliamentary elections it won 2 of the 111 seats in the National Assembly. It was reduced to one seat in the 2012 elections.

References

Defunct political parties in Burkina Faso